Melittology (from Greek , melitta, "bee"; and  -logia) is a branch of entomology concerning the scientific study of bees. It may also be called apicology. Melittology covers the species found in the clade Anthophila within the superfamily Apoidea, comprising more than 20,000 species, including bumblebees and honey bees.

Subdivisions 
 Apiology – (from Latin , "bee"; and Ancient Greek , -logia) is the scientific study of honey bees. Honey bees are often chosen as a study group to answer questions on the evolution of social systems. 
 Apidology is a variant spelling of apiology used outside of the Western Hemisphere, primarily in Europe; it is sometimes used interchangeably with melittology.

Melittological societies
Melittologists and apiologists are served by a number of scientific societies, both national and international in scope. Their main role is to encourage the study of bees and apicultural research.
 International Bee Research Association
 National Bee Association of New Zealand
 British Beekeepers Association
 German Beekeepers Association
 Federation of Irish Beekeepers' Associations

Melittological journals
 Apidologie
 American Bee Journal
 Journal of Apicultural Research
 Journal of Melittology

See also
Bee
Honey bee
Beekeeping
Entomology
I Have a Bee
Vespology
Melissopalynology

References

Bees
Subfields of entomology

Sociobiology